83 may refer to: 
 83 (number)
 83 (film), a 2021 Indian Hindi film.
 one of the years 83 BC, AD 83, 1983, 2083
 "83", a song by John Mayer on his 2001 album Room for Squares

See also
 
 List of highways numbered